Maximilián Samuel Rudolf Ujtelky (20 April 1915, Spišská Nová Ves, Slovakia  – 12 December 1979) was a Slovak chess master and theoretician of Hungarian origin.

Dr. Ujtelky was a direct descendant of famous Hungarian composer Franz Liszt, and his original last name was Ujteleky.

He shared 1st with Jiří Fichtl in Czechoslovak Chess Championship at Ostrava 1960, but lost to him a playoff match for the title. He took 9th at Budapest 1960 (zonal).

He thrice represented Czechoslovakia in Chess Olympiads at Amsterdam 1954, Leipzig 1960, and Havana 1966, twice in European Men's Team Chess Championship at Vienna 1957 (won team bronze medal) and Oberhausen 1961 (won individual bronze medal). and several times in friendly matches.

Awarded the International Master title in 1961.

His name is attached to the Ujtelky System (b6, Bb7, g6, Bg7, d6, e6, Nd7, Ne7), similar opening to Hippopotamus Defence. He was Hero of the Hippo.

References

External links
Maximilian Ujtelky at 365Chess.com
Chessmetrics Player Profile:  Maximilián Ujtelky

1915 births
1979 deaths
Hungarian chess players
Slovak chess players
Chess International Masters
Chess theoreticians
20th-century chess players